Paroo Assembly constituency (also spelt Paru) is an assembly constituency in Muzaffarpur district in the Indian state of Bihar.

Overview
As per Delimitation of Parliamentary and Assembly constituencies Order, 2008, No. 97 Paroo Assembly constituency is composed of the following: Saraiya community development block; Manikpur Bhagwanpur Simra, Chintamanpur, Jagdishpur Baya, Kamalpura, Koriya Nizamat, Laloo Chhapra, Paroo North, Paroo South, Raghunathpur, Rampur Kesho alias Malahi, Bajitpur and Mangurahiyan gram panchayats of Paroo CD Block.

Paroo Assembly constituency is part of No. 16 Vaishali (Lok Sabha constituency).

Members of Legislative Assembly

Election results

2020

References

External links
 

Assembly constituencies of Bihar
Politics of Muzaffarpur district